The Temple of Garni (Gaṙnii tačar) is the only standing Greco-Roman colonnaded building in Armenia and the former Soviet Union. It is the best-known structure and symbol of pre-Christian Armenia.

The structure was probably built by king Tiridates I in the first century AD as a temple to the sun god Mihr. After Armenia's conversion to Christianity in the early fourth century, it was converted into a royal summer house of Khosrovidukht, the sister of Tiridates III. According to some scholars it was not a temple but a tomb and thus survived the destruction of pagan structures. It collapsed in a 1679 earthquake. Renewed interest in the 19th century led to excavations at the site in early and mid-20th century, and its eventual reconstruction between 1969 and 1975, using the anastylosis method. It is one of the main tourist attractions in Armenia and the central shrine of Hetanism (Armenian neopaganism).

Location
The temple is at the edge of a triangular cliff which overlooks the ravine of the Azat River and the Gegham mountains. It is a part of the fortress of Garni, one of Armenia's oldest, that was strategically significant for the defense of the major cities in the Ararat plain. It is mentioned as castellum Gorneas in the first-century Annals of Tacitus. The site is in the village of Garni, in Armenia's Kotayk Province and includes the temple, a Roman bath with a partly preserved mosaic floor with a Greek inscription, a royal summer palace, other "paraphernalia of the Greco-Roman world", the seventh century church of St. Sion and other objects (e.g., medieval khachkars).

Date and function
Natalie Kampen noted that the "date and even its identity as a temple are still debated." Christina Maranci calls it an Ionic structure with an "unclear function." She writes that "while often identified as temple, it may have been a funerary monument, perhaps serving as a royal tomb." 

In Armenian historiography, the dominant view is that it was built in 77 AD, during the reign of king Tiridates I of Armenia. Brady Kiesling stated that this view has been accepted by some scholars, while according to Zhores Khachatryan, who accepted the dating, wrote that most scholars agree with it. The date is calculated based on a Greek inscription, discovered by the painter Martiros Saryan in July 1945 at the Garni cemetery, recently brought from a nearby water mill. It names Tiridates the Sun (Helios Tiridates) as the founder of the temple. Early medieval historian Movses Khorenatsi incorrectly attributed the inscription to Tiridates III. Most scholars now attribute the inscription to Tiridates I. Considering that the inscription says the temple was built in the eleventh year of reign of Tiridates I, the temple is believed to have been completed in 77 AD. The date is primarily linked to Tiridates I's visit to Rome in 66 AD, where he was crowned by Roman emperor Nero. To rebuild the city of Artaxata, destroyed by the Roman general Gnaeus Domitius Corbulo, Nero gave Tiridates 50 million drachmas and provided him with Roman craftsmen. Upon his return to Armenia, Tiridates began a major project of reconstruction, which included rebuilding the fortified city of Garni. It is during this period that the temple is thought to have been built. Some scholars argue that the temple may have been built on top of a Urartian temple.

The following includes an image of the inscription as it stands near the temple today, its textual reconstruction by Ashot G. Abrahamian, an English translation by James R. Russell, and an alternative reading and translation by Poghos Ananian, translated into English by Vrej Nersessian.

In Armenian historiography, the temple is commonly believed to have been dedicated to Mihr, the sun god in the Zoroastrian-influenced Armenian mythology and the equivalent of Mithra. Tiridates, like other Armenian monarchs, considered Mihr their patron. Some scholars have argued that, given the historical context during which the temple was built, i.e. after returning from Rome as king, it would seem natural that Tiridates dedicated the temple to his patron god.

Vrej Nersessian argues that while the "design and ornament are typically Roman, the workmen were local, with experience of carving basalt." Maranci notes that its entablature is similar to that of the temple of Antoninus Pius at Sagalassos in western Asia Minor and to the columns of Attalia and concludes that imperial Roman workmen may have been involved in its construction.

Mausoleum or tomb 
Not all scholars are convinced that the structure was a temple. Arshak Fetvadjian described the temple as an "edifice of Roman style for the pantheistic idol cult fashionable in the days of the Arshakists." In 1950 Kamilla Trever reported that according to a different interpretation of the extant literature and the evidence provided by coinage, the erection of the temple started in 115 AD. The pretext for its construction would have been the declaration of Armenia as a Roman province and the temple would have housed the imperial effigy of Trajan.

In 1982 Richard D. Wilkinson suggested that the building is a tomb, probably constructed circa 175 AD. This theory is based on a comparison to Graeco-Roman buildings of western Asia Minor (e.g. Nereid Monument, Belevi Mausoleum, Mausoleum at Halicarnassus), the discovery of nearby graves that date to about that time, and the discovery of a few marble pieces of the Asiatic sarcophagus style. Wilkinson furthermore states that there is no direct evidence linking the structure to Mithras or Mihr, and that the Greek inscription attributed to Tiridates I probably refers to a former fortress at the Garni site and not to the colonnaded structure now called the Temple of Garni. He also notes that it is unlikely that a pagan temple would survive destruction during Armenia's 4th-century conversion to Christianity when all other such temples were destroyed.  Wilkinson suggests that the structure may be a tomb erected in honor of one of the Romanized kings of Armenia of the late 2nd century.

Felix Ter-Martirosov also believed it was built in the latter half of the 2nd century. Robert H. Hewsen, too, argued, based on the construction of a church in the 7th century next to it rather than in its place, that the building was "more likely the tomb of one of the Roman-appointed kings of Armenia," such as Tiridates I or Sohaimos (r. 140–160). James R. Russell finds the view of the structure being a temple of Mihr baseless. He is also skeptical that the Greek inscription refers to the temple. He opines that the "splendid mausoleum" was erected by Romans living in Armenia. He writes that "Wilkinson convincingly argues [that it] was a tomb of the second century, possibly of one of the Romanized kings of Armenia," possibly Sohaemus, and that it is "unique for the country and testifies to a particularly strong Roman presence."

Later history

Christian period
In the early fourth century, when Armenian King Tiridates III adopted Christianity as a state religion, virtually all known pagan places of worship were destroyed. The Temple of Garni is the only pagan, Hellenistic, or Greco-Roman structure to have survived the widespread destruction. Scholars continue to debate why it was exempted from destruction. Zhores Khachatryan argues that it underwent depaganization and was thereafter seen as a fine structure within the royal palace complex. Tananyan believes its status as a "masterpiece of art" possibly saved it from destruction.

According to Movses Khorenatsi a "cooling-off house" (տուն հովանոց) was built within the fortress of Garni for Khosrovidukht, the sister of Tiridates III. Some scholars believe the temple was thus turned into a royal summer house. The structure presumably underwent some changes. Cult statue(s) in the cella were removed, the opening in the roof for skylight was closed, and the entrance was transformed and adjusted for residence. Ter-Martirosov argued that after Armenia's Christianization, it was initially a royal shrine, but after Khosrovidukht's death c. 325/326 it was transformed into a Christian mausoleum dedicated to her. Hamlet Petrosyan and Zhores Khachatryan rejected the postulated Christianization of the temple.

There is a series of Arabic inscriptions on the walls of the temple, dated 9th-10th centuries, possibly indication of an effort to convert it into a mosque. There is also an Armenian inscription on the entrance wall of the temple. Dated 1291, it was left by princess Khoshak of Garni, the granddaughter of Ivane Zakarian (commander of Georgian-Armenian forces earlier in the 13th century) and Khoshak's son, Amir Zakare. It tells about the release of the population of Garni from taxes in forms of wine, goats, and sheep. Simeon of Aparan, a poet and educator, made the last written record about the temple before its collapse in his 1593 poem titled "Lamentation on the throne of Trdat" («Ողբանք ի վերայ թախթին Տրդատայ թագաւորին»). The Garni fort was damaged when it was captured twice during the Ottoman–Persian Wars, in 1604 and 1638.

Collapse and decline
The entire colonnade of the temple collapsed in a devastating earthquake on June 4, 1679, the epicenter of which was located in the gorge of Garni. Most of the original building blocks remained scattered at the site, allowing the building to be reconstructed. As much as 80% of the original masonry and ornamental friezes were at the site by the late 1960s.

European travelers mentioned the temple in their works as early as the 17th century. Jean Chardin (1673, who visited Armenia before the earthquake) and James Morier (1810s) both incorrectly described it through local informants since they never actually visited the site. Upon Robert Ker Porter's visit the fortress was called "Tackt-i-Tiridate" ("throne of Tiridates" in Persian) by the locals. Ker Porter described what he saw as follows: "a confused pile of beautiful fragments; columns, architraves, capitals, friezes, all mingled together in broken disorder." Another European to visit and document the ruins of the temple was DuBois de Montpereux, who referred to the fortress as "Takh Terdat". In his 1839 book he proposed a reconstruction plan.

J. Buchan Telfer, Captain in the Royal Navy and Fellow of the Society of Antiquaries, visited the site in the 1870s and removed a fragment of the architrave bearing a lion head was removed and bequeathed it to the British Museum in 1907. Telfer described the site as follows:

Reconstruction

The archaeologist Aleksey Uvarov proposed putting de Montpereux's reconstruction plan into action at the fifth All-Russian Archaeological Congress in 1880. He proposed that the temple's stones be moved to Tiflis (in Georgia) and be reconstructed there according to de Montpereux's plan. Lori Khatchadourian suggests that the proposal "could be read as an attempt at co-opting Armenia's Roman past to the glory of Russia through the relocation of its most iconic monument to the nearest administrative center." The governor of Erivan, citing technical difficulties with moving its parts, did not implement the plan.

In the subsequent decades scholars such as Nikoghayos Buniatian, Babken Arakelyan, and Nikolay Tokarsky studied the temple. In 1909–11, during an excavation led by Nicholas Marr, the temple ruins were uncovered. Buniatian sought to reconstruct the temple in the 1930s. In 1949 the Armenian Academy of Sciences began major excavations of the Garni fortress site led by Babken Arakelyan. Architectural historian Alexander Sahinian focused on the temple itself. It was not until almost twenty years later, on December 10, 1968, that the Soviet Armenian government approved the reconstruction plan of the temple. A group led by Sahinian began reconstruction works in January 1969. It was completed by 1975, almost 300 years after it was destroyed in an earthquake. The temple was almost entirely rebuilt using its original stones, except the missing pieces which were filled with blank (undecorated) stones. In 1978 a fountain-monument dedicated to Sahinian's reconstruction was erected near the temple.

Architecture

Overview
The temple follows the general style of classical Ancient Greek architecture which originated in the seventh century BC. Scholars have variously described the structure as Greek, Roman or Greco-Roman and have usually linked it to Hellenistic art, often pointing out its distinct features and local Armenian influence. Natalie Kampen noted that it "shares a Graeco-Roman vocabulary with the use of basalt rather than marble." Toros Toramanian stressed the singularity of the temple as a Roman-style building on the Armenian Highlands and "remarked that the Garni construction essentially had no influence on contemporary or subsequent Armenian architecture." Sirarpie Der Nersessian argued that the temple, of a Roman type, "lies outside the line of development of Armenian architecture." Sahinian, the architect who oversaw its reconstruction, emphasized the local Armenian influence on its architecture, calling it an "Armenian-Hellenic" monument. He further insisted that it resembles the 9th century BC Urartian Musasir temple.

Exterior
The temple is a peripteros built on an elevated podium. There is a – wide stairway with nine steps on the northern side leading to the chamber. The temple is constructed of grey basalt quarried locally and without the use of mortar. The blocks are instead bound together by iron and bronze clamps. The temple is composed of a portico (pronaos) and a cella (naos). Based on a comparative analysis, Sahinian proposed that the design of the columns have their origins in Asia Minor. In its proportions, the temple has been compared to the Roman temples of Maison carrée in Nîmes, and Temple of Augustus and Livia in Vienne, France.

The triangular pediment depicts sculptures of plants and geometrical figures. The stairway has nine unusually high steps— high, about twice as high as the average height of steps. Tananyan suggests that the unusually high steps compel a person ascending the steps to feel humbled and make physical effort to reach the altar. On both sides of the stairway there are roughly square pedestals. Atlas, the Greek mythological Titan who held up the earth, is sculpted on both pedestals in a way seemingly trying to hold the entire temple on its shoulders. It is assumed that, originally, pedestals held up altars (sacrificial tables). 

The exterior of the temple is richly decorated. The frieze depicts a continuous line of acanthus. Furthermore, there are ornaments on the capital, architrave, and soffit. The stones in the front cornice have projecting sculptures of lion heads. Sirarpie Der Nersessian argued that its "rich acanthus scrolls, with interposed lion masks and occasional palmettes, the fine Ionic and acanthus capitals, the other floral and geometric ornaments, are typical of the contemporary monuments of Asia Minor."

Cella
No more than 20 people can fit inside the cella. Due to the relatively small size of the cella, it has been proposed that a statue once stood inside and the ceremonies were held in the outside.

Current state and use
The temple is widely considered the most important monument of ancient and pre-Christian Armenia. It is the sole standing Greco-Roman colonnaded building in Armenia and the former Soviet Union. Art historian Antony Eastmond describes it as the "easternmost building of the Graeco-Roman world."

Tourist attraction

It became a tourist destination even before its reconstruction in the 1970s. Today, it is, along with the nearby medieval monastery of Geghard, one of the main tourist attraction sites in Armenia. Most people visit the two sites together. They are collectively known as Garni–Geghard (Գառնի-Գեղարդ). In 2013 some 200,000 people visited the temple. The number of visitors almost doubled by 2019, prior to the COVID-19 pandemic, when Garni received almost 390,000 visitors, including 250,000 Armenians and 137,400 foreigners.

Notable individuals who have visited the temple include presidents of Greece (Karolos Papoulias), Cyprus (Demetris Christofias), and Austria (Heinz Fischer), the Spanish opera singer Montserrat Caballé, American TV personalities Khloé and Kim Kardashian, and Conan O'Brien, Michaëlle Jean, Secretary-General of the Francophonie, Japan's Foreign Minister Taro Kono, Russian pop star Philipp Kirkorov.

Preservation
The temple and the fortress are part of the Garni Historical and Cultural Museum Reserve, which occupies  and is supervised by the Service for the Protection of Historical Environment and Cultural Museum Reservations, an agency attached to the Ministry of Culture of Armenia. The government-approved list of historical and cultural monuments includes 11 objects within the site.

In a 2006 survey the state of conservation of Garni was rated by over three-quarters of the visitors as "good" or "very good". In 2011 UNESCO awarded the Museum-Reservation of Garni the Melina Mercouri International Prize for the Safeguarding and Management of Cultural Landscapes for "measures taken to preserve its cultural vestiges, and the emphasis placed on efforts to interpret and open the site for national and international visitors."

Incidents
On September 25, 2014 a Russian tourist in his early 20s, defaced the temple by spray painting "В мире идол ничто" (literally translating to "In the world, idol is nothing"). The painting was cleaned days later. The Armenian state service for protection of historical and cultural reserves filed a civil lawsuit against Nikitenko in February 2015, in which the agency requested 839,390 AMD (~$1,760) to recover the damage resulting from vandalism. In an April 2015 decision the Kotayk Province court ruled to fine him the requested amount.

On September 4, 2021 a sanctioned private wedding ceremony took place at the site causing much controversy. The site was closed for visitors that day. The local authorities of Garni said they had opposed it in a written statement to the Culture Ministry. The Culture Ministry said the agency responsible for the preservation of the site had acted independently in allowing the event to take place.

Neopagan shrine
Since 1990, the temple has been the central shrine of the small number of followers of Armenian neopaganism (close to Zoroastrianism) who hold annual ceremonies at the temple, especially on March 21—the pagan New Year. On that day, which coincides with Nowruz, the Iranian New Year, Armenian neopagans celebrate the birthday of the god of fire, Vahagn. Celebrations by neopagans are also held during the summer festival of Vardavar, which has pre-Christian (pagan) origins.

Notable events

The torch of the first Pan-Armenian Games was lit near the temple on August 28, 1999.

The square in front of the temple has been occasionally used as a venue for concerts:
A concert of classical music was held near the temple on July 2, 2004 by the National Chamber Orchestra of Armenia, conducted by Aram Gharabekian. The orchestra played the works of Aram Khachaturian, Komitas, Edvard Mirzoyan, Strauss, Mozart, and other composers.
On May 6, 2019 Acid Pauli performed a live concert of electronic music in front of the temple.
On July 14, 2019 Armenia's National Chamber Orchestra performed a concert in front of the temple dedicated to the 150th anniversaries of Komitas and Hovhannes Tumanyan.
On September 8, 2022 a Star Party within the Starmus VI festival took place at the temple featuring the rock band Nosound, Sebu Simonian from the band Capital Cities, and the festival's speakers, including Charlie Duke, Charles Bolden, Kip Thorne, Brian Greene, Michel Mayor, George Smoot, John C. Mather as special guests.

In film and television
The ruins of the temple are depicted in the 1962 Soviet Armenian film Rings of Glory («Кольца славы»), featuring the Olympic gymnast Albert Azaryan.
The pre-reconstructed temple is featured prominently in the second segment of the 1966 Soviet Armenian anthology film People of the Same City («Նույն քաղաքի մարդիկ») titled "Garni".
In 1985 an episode of the Soviet televised music festival Pesnya goda ("Song of the Year") was recorded near the temple. It was noted for Alla Pugacheva's performance.
Some scenes of the 1985 Polish film Podróże Pana Kleksa (Travels of Mr. Kleks) were shot at the temple.
Several scenes of the 1986 Soviet musical film A Merry Chronicle of a Dangerous Voyage (Весёлая хроника опасного путешествия) were shot at the temple.
Garni features prominently in the 2007 Vigen Chaldranyan film The Priestess (Քրմուհին), where the priestess of the temple (portrayed by Ruzan Vit Mesropyan) commits adultery and is consequently expelled from it.
American comedian Conan O'Brien and his Armenian-American assistant Sona Movsesian filmed part of an episode dancing at the temple of Garni during their visit in October 2015. The episode aired on his late-night talk show on November 17, 2015 and scored 1.3 million viewers.
In episode 6 ("Let the Good Times Roll") of the American reality television show The Amazing Race 28, first aired on April 1, 2016, the contestants make a pit stop at the temple.

Gallery

See also
Armenian Native Faith
List of Ancient Greek temples

References
Notes

References

Bibliography

Books

 

Journal articles

Further reading

External links

 
 
 Garni at Armenica.org

Archaeological sites in Armenia
Populated places in Kotayk Province
Temples in Armenia
Former populated places in the Caucasus
Tourist attractions in Kotayk Province
Ancient Roman temples
Buildings and structures in Kotayk Province
1975 establishments in the Soviet Union
1st-century BC establishments in Armenia
Armenia in the Roman era
Ancient Armenian religion